The 2022 Arizona State Sun Devils baseball team represented Arizona State University during the 2022 NCAA Division I baseball season. The Sun Devils played their home games at Phoenix Municipal Stadium as a member of the Pac-12 Conference. They were led by head coach Willie Bloomquist, in his 1st season at ASU.

Previous season

The Sun Devils finished with a record of 33–22, and 16–14 in conference play. In the postseason, the Sun Devils were invited and participated in the 2021 NCAA Division I baseball tournament, where they lost to the #2 national seed Texas and Fairfield in the Austin Regional in Austin, Texas.

In the offseason, Tracy Smith was fired from his role as head coach after 7 seasons with the program. A few days later, it was announced that Willie Bloomquist was hired as the new head coach.

Personnel

Roster

Coaching staff

Schedule

|-
! colspan=2 style="" | Regular Season: 20–21 (Home: 15–10; Away: 5–11; Neutral: 0–0)
|- valign="top"
|

|-
|

|-
|

|-
|

|- 
|- style="text-align:center;"
|   
|}

Source:

Rankings

References

Arizona State Sun Devils baseball seasons
Arizona State Sun Devils
Arizona State Sun Devils baseball